David Dwain Phelps (born October 26, 1947) is an American educator and politician and former Democratic member of the U.S. House of Representatives from Illinois.

Early life
Phelps was born in Eldorado, Illinois. He graduated from Southern Illinois University in 1969. Phelps was trained as an educator. After teaching for several years, he became a school administrator. From 1980 to 1984 he served as Saline County Clerk and Recorder. Phelps was a member of the Illinois House of Representatives from 1984 until 1998.

U.S. Congress
He was elected to Congress in 1998 from Illinois's 19th congressional district after 10-year incumbent Glenn Poshard made an unsuccessful run for governor. In 2002, Illinois lost a district as a result of the 2000 Census.  Phelps' district was dismantled and split between three neighboring districts.  His home in Eldorado was drawn into the Champaign-Urbana based 15th District, while Decatur, the heart of his former district, was shifted to the Quad Cities-based 17th District.  The bulk of his former district was merged with the neighboring 20th District.  Phelps ran against 20th District Republican incumbent John Shimkus in the general election.  The new district was numerically Phelps' district—the 19th.  However, it was geographically and demographically more Shimkus' district; Phelps only retained 35 percent of his former territory.  The campaign was very bitter; both men accused the other's staffers of stalking their families.  Shimkus won by over 20,000 votes in this much more conservative district.

The Illinois Office of Executive Inspector General found that David Phelps, a Democrat from Harrisburg, should be banned from working in state government because of his behavior as an assistant director of the Illinois Department of Transportation from 2003 to 2011. Phelps quit his $127,700 post in 2011 in the midst of an unfolding scandal involving similar allegations against one of his deputies at the agency, Danny Clayton. Three other workers and one contractor also were ensnared in the probe. Phelps was hired by former Gov. Rod Blagojevich after losing a bid for Congress to Republican U.S. Rep. John Shimkus of Collinsville in the 2002 election.

Phelps is a Blue Dog Democrat. While in Congress, he was strongly anti-abortion, pro-gun, and co-sponsored the Federal Marriage Amendment.

A professional songwriter, Phelps toured the nation as a gospel singer, in a quartet with his brothers. While serving in the U.S. House, he was the hymn director for the Congressional Weekly Prayer Breakfast on Capitol Hill.

Post congressional life
As of August 2017, he was serving as a member of the Saline County Board.

Both his nephew, Brandon Phelps, and daughter, Natalie Phelps Finnie, served as members of the Illinois House of Representatives from the 118th district.

Electoral history

References

 http://thesouthern.com/news/local/govt-and-politics/former-congressman-cited-in-ethics-probe/article_191d9a70-a5f8-11e2-83be-001a4bcf887a.html

External links

 

1947 births
Living people
Democratic Party members of the Illinois House of Representatives
American gospel singers
Baptists from Illinois
Democratic Party members of the United States House of Representatives from Illinois
People from Eldorado, Illinois
21st-century American politicians
County clerks in Illinois
County board members in Illinois